Nathaniel Cannon Smith (1866–1943), professionally known as Nat. C. Smith, was an American painter and architect of New Bedford, Massachusetts.

Life and career
Nathaniel Cannon Smith was born January 18, 1866, in New Bedford, Massachusetts, to William T. and Caroline A. (Brownell) Smith. He attended the New Bedford public schools, graduating from New Bedford High School in 1885. For the next three and one-half years he was a student and associate of Edward G. Dobbins, engraver and illustrator. Though he began to advance in that trade, he decided instead to study architecture, sailing for Paris in 1889. He was a student of the Beaux-Arts de Paris and was a member of the atelier of Henri Duray. In 1893 Smith returned to New Bedford, where he established himself as an architect. With the exception of the years 1913 to 1919, when he was in partnership with Myron P. Howland, Smith was a private practitioner for his entire career. He was in active practice until his retirement circa 1940.

Personal life
Smith was deeply interested in art and was a long-time supporter and instructor of the Swain School of Design. In 1900 he became an associate of the Society of Beaux-Arts Architects, later known as the Beaux-Arts Institute of Design. For several years Smith operated a small architectural atelier in New Bedford, in association with the Institute. Smith was also a member of the Wamsutta Club and an organizer of the New Bedford Art Club, active from 1907 to 1920.

Smith married in 1897 to Alice M. Adams of New Bedford. They had one daughter.

Though an architect by profession, Smith was also a painter who exhibited in New Bedford and elsewhere.

Smith died in New Bedford in 1943.

Legacy
Several buildings built to Smith's designs have been listed on the United States National Register of Historic Places, and others contribute to listed historic districts.

Architectural works

Nat. C. Smith, 1893-1913
 1894 - Union for Good Works Building, 12 Market St, New Bedford, Massachusetts
 1895 - William H. Wood House, 408 County St, New Bedford, Massachusetts
 1896 - Quequechan Club, 306 N Main St, Fall River, Massachusetts
 1897 - Slocum Building, 908 Purchase St, New Bedford, Massachusetts
 1898 - Edward H. Abbe Houses (6), Clinton Pl, New Bedford, Massachusetts
 A planned cul-de-sac.
 1898 - William L. Chadwick House, 117 Mill St, New Bedford, Massachusetts
 1898 - New Bedford Textile Institute, 1213 Purchase St, New Bedford, Massachusetts
 1899 - Union Baptist Church, 109 Court St, New Bedford, Massachusetts
 1900 - John Duff House (Remodeling), 479 County St, New Bedford, Massachusetts
 1902 - Bartholomew Gosnold Monument, Cuttyhunk, Massachusetts
 1902 - Y. M. C. A. Building, 199 N Main St, Fall River, Massachusetts
 1903 - Jennie Smith Grinnell House, 32 Maple St, New Bedford, Massachusetts
 1909 - New Bedford Free Public Library (Remodeling), 613 Pleasant St, New Bedford, Massachusetts
 1910 - Nathaniel C. Smith House, 1 Howland Ter, New Bedford, Massachusetts
 Home of the architect.
 1912 - Brockton Public Library, 304 Main St, Brockton, Massachusetts

Smith & Howland, 1913-1919
 1913 - Ulrich C. Collette Building, 1566-1570 Acushnet Ave, New Bedford, Massachusetts
 1914 - Thomas B. Wilcox, Jr. House, 9 Maple St, New Bedford, Massachusetts
 1915 - Cummings Building, 96 William St, New Bedford, Massachusetts
 1916 - Henry Watson House, 383 W Clifton St, New Bedford, Massachusetts
 1917 - Office Building, Oak Grove Cemetery, New Bedford, Massachusetts

Nat. C. Smith, from 1919
 1919 - J. V. O'Neil House, 572 Rockdale Ave, New Bedford, Massachusetts
 1921 - Clarence A. Cook School (Old), 91 Summer St, New Bedford, Massachusetts
 1922 - Charles L. Neild House, 554 Rockdale Ave, New Bedford, Massachusetts
 1923 - Tifereth Israel Synagogue (Old), 42 S 6th St, New Bedford, Massachusetts
 1927 - Crapo Memorial Gallery, Swain School of Design, 19 Hawthorn St, New Bedford, Massachusetts
 1934 - Warming House, Buttonwood Park, Oneida St, New Bedford, Massachusetts

References

External links
Flickr image of a ship painting by Smith

Architects from Massachusetts
American alumni of the École des Beaux-Arts
19th-century American architects
20th-century American architects
People from New Bedford, Massachusetts
1866 births
1943 deaths